Abnousse Shalmani (born 1 April 1977 in Tehran, Iran) is a French journalist and writer.

Shalmani was one of the authors along with Peggy Sastre of the open letter criticising #MeToo sent to the leading French newspaper, Le Monde, signed by over 100 high-profile French women. The letter advocated in part that a "freedom to bother" – a man's right to make a pass at a woman, even if a clumsy one – was "indispensable to sexual freedom".

References

External links 
 

Living people
1977 births
Iranian emigrants to France